Angela "Angi" Cipra is a retired American collegiate artistic gymnast. She competed for the UCLA Bruins gymnastics team in the Pac-12 Conference. She represented the team from 2014 to 2017.

She currently performs with Le Rêve in Las Vegas.

Early life 
Cipra first started out in gymnastics classes at Ultimate Gymnastics in Phoenix, which has since closed. After leaving Ultimate, Angi moved to the renowned gymnastics facility, Desert Devils Gymnastics in Mesa. After transferring to the program, Cipra won both the State and Regional titles for her age division at Level 8. Following this season, she transferred straight to Level 10.

Gymnastics career

2010–13: Level 10 career 
Cipra transferred to Level 10 for the 2010 season; at the age of fourteen. After being crowned Arizona State champion, Cipra suffered a tough performance at Regionals and failed to advance to Nationals. In 2011, Cipra was fifth at States, competing on bars only; which she won. At Regionals, she placed seventh in the all-around, advancing to Nationals. However, she elected not to attend.

Cipra captured both State and Regional titles throughout the 2012 season. Angi competed at her first and only ever J.O. Nationals in May 2012; placing twenty-second in the all-around but becoming floor champion. A week later, on May 17, 2012, she announced her verbal commitment to the UCLA Bruins gymnastics program.

On November 21, 2012, Cipra signed the National Letter of Intent to the UCLA Bruins. In her senior season, in 2013, Cipra was fourth at States and was twelfth at Regionals.

College career

Personal life 
Cipra attended Saguaro High School from 2009 to 2013; only 15 miles away from her gym.

References 

UCLA Bruins women's gymnasts
University of California, Los Angeles alumni
American female artistic gymnasts
Living people
Level 10 gymnasts
Sportspeople from Phoenix, Arizona
Year of birth missing (living people)